Stenoptilia dolini is a moth of the family Pterophoridae. It is found in Georgia (the Zikazskyj Pass).

References
 , 2007, Zeitschrift der Arbeitsgemeinschaft Österreichische Entomologen 59: 61-64.

Moths described in 2007
dolini
Moths of Asia